Jean Raoul Chaurand-Naurac (28 February 1878 – 3 October 1948) was a French painter. His work was part of the painting event in the art competition at the 1928 Summer Olympics.

References

External links
 

1878 births
1948 deaths
20th-century French painters
20th-century French male artists
French male painters
Olympic competitors in art competitions
Artists from Lyon
19th-century French male artists